Avatara Purusha is a 1989 Indian Kannada-language action thriller film, which stars Ambareesh and Sumalatha in the leading roles.

Cast
Ambareesh
Sumalatha
Jai Jagadish
C. R. Simha
Sudheer
Devaraj
Balakrishna
Dinesh
Lakshman
Thimmayya
Saikumar 
Lohithashwa 
Vasudeva Rao 
Parvathavani 
Pandaribai
Tara
Jyothi
Disco Shanthi
Mysore Lokesh
Shashikiran
Shani Mahadevappa
Srishailan
Bharathish
Vijay
Shanthamma
Shyamala
Anitharani
Sujatha
Shobharani
Uma

Soundtrack
"Kannugala Thereyo" - S. P. Balasubrahmanyam
"Ee Raatri" - Manjula Gururaj
"Saagarake Chandramana" - Vani Jairam, S. P. Balasubrahmanyam
"Prema Hrudayada" - Manjula Gururaj, S. P. Balasubrahmanyam
"Kulukutha Balakuve" - Vani Jairam, S. P. Balasubrahmanyam

Release

References

External links
 

1991 action thriller films
Indian action thriller films
1991 films
1990s Kannada-language films
Films scored by Vijayanand